The Keating Building, also known as The Keating Hotel, is a 35-room luxury boutique hotel in San Diego.  Located in the center of the Gaslamp Quarter, the Keating is located near the San Diego Convention Center, Balboa Theater, and Petco Park.

It is a five-story Romanesque Revival-style building, built as an office building with then modern conveniences of steam heat and a wire cage elevator, in 1890.  It was designed by George J. Keating and was completed by the Reid Brothers after Keating's death.  The San Diego Savings Bank occupied the corner space in the building from 1893 to about 1912, and its old safe was still in the building in 1980.

In the 2000s its interior was redesigned by Pininfarina and in 2007 it was re-opened as the Keating Hotel.

In 2012, the hotel was featured on the FOX reality series Hotel Hell starring Gordon Ramsay.

The Hotel was closed in March 2020.

References

External links

 

Hotels in California
Gaslamp Quarter, San Diego	
National Register of Historic Places in San Diego County, California
Romanesque Revival architecture in California